The 2003 All-Africa Games football tournament was held in Abuja, Nigeria between 3–16 October 2003 as part of the 2003 All-Africa Games and featured both a men's and women's African Games football tournament.
Both tournaments featured eight (8) teams. In Men's play, Cameroon became the first nation to win this tournament three times. The Women's tournament was the first-ever for the Games.

Medal summary

Results

Medal table

References

 
2003
2003 All-Africa Games
2003
All
Africa